This is a list of Sports Badges awarded by the Federal Republic of Germany

State decorations
 Silver Laurel Leaf (Silbernes Lorbeerblatt)

Awards of the German Olympic Sports Association
 German Sports Badge (Deutsches Sportabzeichen)
 German Sports Badge for juveniles

Awards by the German Athletics Organization
 German track and field badge
 Running Badge
 Power walking badge

Awards by type of sport

Swimming
 German swimming badge
 German rescue swimming badge
 German snorkeling badge

Military awards
 German Armed Forces Badge for Military Proficiency

Obsolete awards
 SA Sports Badge (SA-Sportabzeichen)
 Hitler Youth Leader's Gold Sports Badge (Goldenes Fuhrersportabzeichen der Hitler Jugend)
 Hitler Youth Proficiency Badge (Leistungsabzeichen der Hitler Jugend)
 Sports Badge of the GDR (Sportleistungsabzeichen der DDR) 
Note: Public wear of all Nazi Party awards, including sports badges, was banned after 1945.

References

German sports trophies and awards